Ankistrodon is an extinct genus of archosauriform known from the Early Triassic Panchet Formation of India. First thought to be a theropod dinosaur, it was later determined to be a proterosuchid. The type species is A. indicus, described by prolific British zoologist Thomas Henry Huxley in 1865. One authority in the 1970s classified Ankistrodon as a senior synonym of Proterosuchus.

References

Fossil taxa described in 1865
Early Triassic reptiles of Asia
Taxa named by Thomas Henry Huxley
Prehistoric reptile genera